Greenridge Cemetery is a historic cemetery in Saratoga Springs, New York.

Notable burials
 Seymour Ainsworth (1821–1890)
 George Sherman Batcheller (1837–1908)
 George S. Bolster (1913–1989)
 Charles Brackett (1892–1969)
 Edgar T. Brackett (1853–1924)
 Robert Newton Brezee (1851–1929)
 Nelson Cook (1808–1892)
 Ransom Cook (1794–1881)
 Clarence Dart (1920–2012)
 Lucretia Maria Davidson (1808–1825)
 Nicholas B. Doe (1786–1856)
 Charles F. Dowd (1824–1904)
 Lavelle Ensor (1900–1947)

 Henry H. Hathorn (1813–1887)
 Sam Hildreth (1866–1929)
 Tommy Luther (1908–2001)
 James M. Marvin (1809–1901)
 Lyman C. Pettit (1868–1950)
Tabor B. Reynolds (1821–1901)
 William A. Sackett (1811–1895)
Clarence C. Smith (1883–1983)
Kathryn H. Starbuck (1887–1965)
 William Leete Stone, Jr. (1835–1908)
 William Leete Stone, Sr. (1792 or 1793–1844)
 Sylvester E. Veitch (1910–1996)
 Clarence A. Walworth (1820–1900)
 Ellen Hardin Walworth (1832–1915)
 Reuben H. Walworth (1788–1867)
 Cornelius Vanderbilt Whitney (1899–1992)
 John Willard (judge) (1792–1862)
 Monty Woolley (1888–1963)

References

External links

 Greenridge Cemetery Association
 Greenridge Cemetery at Saratoga Springs Heritage Area and Visitor Center
 
   

Saratoga Springs, New York
Cemeteries in Saratoga County, New York